Patrick Chagas Valério Lourenço (born 2 July 1993) is a Brazilian amateur boxer. He reached quarterfinals at the 2013 World Championships and qualified for the 2016 Summer Olympics.

References

1993 births
Living people
Sportspeople from Rio de Janeiro (city)
Olympic boxers of Brazil
Boxers at the 2016 Summer Olympics
Brazilian male boxers
Light-flyweight boxers
21st-century Brazilian people